The Natchitoches National Fish Hatchery is a federal, warm water fish hatchery located in Natchitoches, Louisiana, United States.  Natchitoches is involved in spawning, hatching and rearing young fish.

Facilities
In addition, the facility has the Harold B. Wales Environmental Education Classroom, which is used for kindergarten through twelfth grade and for teacher workshops. The classroom seats 32 students and has 16 student grade dissecting microscopes.

The fish
Natchitoches handles six species of fish, in addition to the Alligator snapping turtle and the Louisiana pearlshell mussel.

Paddlefish
The paddlefish (Polyodon spathula) is the only remaining member of the family Polyodontidae.  Paddlefish are spawned and raised at Natchitoches until they are approximately six to ten inches (254 mm)  in length, before they are released into the wild.

Striped bass
Striped bass (Morone saxatilis) are members of the sea bass family.  Natchitoches National Fish Hatchery is working to restore the historical range and population levels of these fish.

Pallid sturgeon
The Pallid sturgeon (Scaphirhynchus albus) is a member of the sturgeon family.  The hatchery is working to develop spawning and culture techniques to raise a large number of Pallid sturgeon.  Workers at the hatchery hope to raise enough of these fish to take the species off of the Endangered Species List.

Channel catfish
The Channel catfish (Ictalurus punctatus) is a member of the family Ictaluridae.  Natchitoches works to raise many of these fish for release into the wild.

Largemouth bass
The Largemouth bass (Micropterus salmoides) is the most desired of all freshwater game.  Because of this, these bass require the attention of resource management agencies.  Natchitoches National Fish Hatchery raises over 1 million largemouth bass every year.

Bluegill
The Bluegill (Lepomis macrochirus) is a fish that is quite easy to catch.  The hatchery raises many of these fish every year.

References

External links
 Natchitoches National Fish Hatchery
 F.I.S.H. (Friends In Support of the Hatchery)
 ExploreNatchitoches.com

Buildings and structures in Natchitoches, Louisiana
National Fish Hatcheries of the United States
Landmarks in Louisiana
Education in Natchitoches Parish, Louisiana
Tourist attractions in Natchitoches Parish, Louisiana
Aquaria in Louisiana
Agricultural buildings and structures in Louisiana